This is a list of Finnish MPs who have been imprisoned for political reasons.

Grand Duchy of Finland

In 1918 imprisoned and executed MPs

In 1918 executed

Deaths in prison camps

Other 1918 imprisoned MPs

Independent Republic of Finland

In 1923 imprisoned Socialist Workers' Party MPs

Other

References

Lists of members of the Parliament of Finland